James Pratt Stafford (1 January 1844 – 24 August 1919) was an English cricketer. Stafford's batting and bowling styles are unknown. He was born at Godalming, Surrey.

Stafford made a single first-class appearance for Surrey against Yorkshire in 1864 at Brammall Lane, Sheffield. Surrey won the toss and elected to bat first, making 195 all out, with Stafford the last man out in the innings, dismissed for a duck by Luke Greenwood. Yorkshire were then dismissed for 236 in their first-innings, during which Stafford bowled twelve wicketless overs, which conceded 31 runs. In response, Surrey made 247 all out in their second-innings, with Stafford once again the last man out when he was dismissed for a duck by Roger Iddison. Yorkshire reached 33/2 in their second-innings, at which point the match was declared a draw.

He died at Fratton, Hampshire, on 24 August 1919.

References

External links
James Stafford at ESPNcricinfo
James Stafford at CricketArchive

1844 births
1919 deaths
People from Godalming
English cricketers
Surrey cricketers